Famine Warhouse 1848, traditionally known as the Ballingarry Warhouse or The Widow McCormack's House, is an Irish farmhouse famous as the site of a skirmish in the Young Irelander Rebellion of 1848 (Ireland's contribution to the Springtime of the Peoples), at which the Irish tricolour was flown for the first time.

Rebels led by William Smith O'Brien besieged 47 policemen of the Irish Constabulary. After the loss of two men the rebels retreated, and were later arrested and transported.

Known locally as the Warhouse, it became a National Monument in 1989, was renovated in 2000–01 and was renamed "Famine Warhouse 1848" in 2004. Today it houses a museum with exhibits on the Great Famine and mass emigration, the rebellion, the high treason trials and exile of the Young Ireland leaders in Australia and their escapes to the US.

References

Buildings and structures in County Tipperary
Tourist attractions in County Tipperary
Agricultural buildings in Ireland
National Monuments in County Tipperary